The Stations of the Exodus are the locations visited by the Israelites following their exodus from Egypt, according to the Hebrew Bible. In the itinerary given in Numbers 33, forty-two stations are listed, although this list differs slightly from the narrative account of the journey found in Exodus and Deuteronomy.

Biblical commentators like St Jerome in his Epistle to Fabiola, Bede (Letter to Acca: "De Mansionibus Filiorum Israhel") and St Peter Damian discussed the Stations according to the Hebrew meanings of their names.<ref>Gregory F. LaNave, et al., The Fathers of the Church: Mediaeval Continuation, The Letters of Peter Damian 151-180, Letter 160, pp. 110 ff., The Catholic University of America Press, Washington D.C. (2005)</ref> Dante modeled the 42 chapters of his Vita Nuova on them.

Sources
According to the documentary hypothesis, the list of the Stations was originally a distinct and separate source text. Proponents of this hypothesis believe that the redactor, in combining the Torah's sources, used parts of the Stations list to fill out awkward joins between the main sources. However, a slightly variant version of the list appears in full at Numbers 33, and several parts of the journey described in the full list (most noticeably the journey from Sinai to Zin) do not appear in the fragmented version. 

Both versions of the list contain several brief narrative fragments. For example, Exodus 15:27 reads: "[The Israelites] came to Elim, where there were twelve springs of water and seventy palm trees". It is a matter of some debate as to how much of the narrative is part of the original text of the list, and how much is extra detail added into it by the redactor. Some information may also have been drawn from other sources; Numbers 21 contains both an extract from the lost Book of the Wars of the Lord'', and the text of a song about the digging of a well at Beer.

Locating the Stations
Attempting to locate many of the stations of the Israelite Exodus is a difficult task, if not infeasible. Though most scholars concede that the narrative of the Exodus may have a historical basis, the event in question would have been nothing like the mass-emigration and subsequent forty years of desert nomadism described in the biblical account. If a smaller-scale exodus did take place, no trace of it has been found in the archaeological record, so archaeology can give no clues as to the modern-day locations of the stations.

Another factor complicating the issue is that the narrative descriptions of many of the stations lack recognizable distinguishing features, or are very broadly defined. For example, Marah, the fifth station, is described only as a place where the Israelites found the drinking water to be exceptionally bitter. The locations of some stations are given in relative terms, such as the "Wilderness of Sin", which is simply described as the area between Elim and Mount Sinai – given the numerous traditions of the exact location of Mount Sinai, the location of the Wilderness of Sin cannot be positively determined. Other locations central to the narrative, such as the Sea of Reeds and Raamses, also lack positive identification, making it more difficult to plot a plausible map of the Israelites' journey. As such, proposed identifications of the stations of the Exodus are almost entirely conjectural.

List of the Stations of the Exodus

Notes

References

 
Documentary hypothesis
Book of Exodus
Book of Numbers